The Perth Amboy Refinery is a refinery built in 1920. It is between Convery Boulevard and State Street in Perth Amboy, New Jersey, adjacent to the Outerbridge Crossing. Via rail it is served by Conrail's Chemical Coast and the former Perth Amboy and Woodbridge lines. Oil tankers and lighter can reach the refinery along the Arthur Kill.

History
The refinery opened in 1920, by the Barber Asphalt Company.

Chevron Corporation acquired the Perth Amboy Refinery in 1945.

In 1983 the refinery stopped production of gasoline and heating oil and concentrated on asphalt refining.

A spill occurred in 2006 that resulted in approximately 31,000 gallons of oil released. Approximately 119,448 gallons of oil-water mixture were recovered and stored. Approximately 477,234 pounds of oil absorbents and other contaminated solids were removed during the cleanup.

In 2012 the refinery was sold to Buckeye Partners for $260 million. Buckeye planned to again produce multiple petroleum products at the site.

References 

Oil refineries in the United States
Energy infrastructure in New Jersey
Perth Amboy, New Jersey
Chevron Corporation
Buildings and structures in Middlesex County, New Jersey
Buckeye Partners
1920 establishments in New Jersey